'Hon. Fulk or Fulke Greville Howard (3 April 1773 – 4 March 1846), of Elford Hall, Staffordshire and Castle Rising, Norfolk, was an English politician. In early life he was known as Fulk Greville Upton.

Life
He was born at Geneva, the younger son of Clotworthy Upton, 1st Baron Templetown and educated at Westminster School (1786–1791), Christ Church, Oxford 1791 and the Military Academy in Berlin. He took his wife's surname of Howard on 6 August 1807, shortly after their marriage.

He joined the Army and was an ensign in the 1st Foot Guards (1793), lieutenant and captain (1794), captain and lieutenant-colonel (1804), lieutenant-colonel of the 7th West Indian Regiment (1807). Reduced to half-pay, he commanded the Irish 9th garrison battalion (July 1807), was brevet colonel in 1813 and fully retired in 1825. He took part in the Anglo-Russian invasion of Holland during the French Revolutionary Wars in 1799, losing the sight of one eye in the Helder Expedition.

He was a Member (MP) of the Parliament of the United Kingdom for Castle Rising from 29 January 1808 to 1832.

He had married Mary, the daughter and heiress of Richard Howard (formerly Bagot) of Elford Hall, Staffordshire and Castle Rising. They had no children and his property was therefore dispersed among his relatives.

He was elected a Fellow of the Royal Society in 1803.

References

1773 births
1846 deaths
People from Elford
People educated at Westminster School, London
Alumni of Christ Church, Oxford
People from Castle Rising
West India Regiment officers
UK MPs 1807–1812
UK MPs 1812–1818
UK MPs 1818–1820
UK MPs 1820–1826
UK MPs 1826–1830
UK MPs 1830–1831
UK MPs 1831–1832
Fellows of the Royal Society
Members of the Parliament of the United Kingdom for English constituencies
Grenadier Guards officers
British Army personnel of the French Revolutionary Wars